Ravindra Shripad Kulkarni (born 1942) is an Indian mathematician, specializing in differential geometry. He is known for the Kulkarni–Nomizu product.

Education and career
Ravi S. Kulkarni received in 1968 his Ph.D. from Harvard University under Shlomo Sternberg with thesis Curvature and Metric. For the academic year 1980–1981 he was a Guggenheim Fellow.

He has served as the president of the Ramanujan Mathematical Society.

Selected publications

with Allan L. Edmonds & John H. Ewing: 
with Allan L. Edmonds & Robert E. Stong: 
with Gregory Constantine: 
with Hyman Bass: 

with Krishnendu Gongopadhyay:

as editor
 with Ulrich Pinkall:

References

External links
Conformal Geometry and Riemann  Surfaces: A Conference in Honor of Professor Ravi S. Kulkarni, posted 28 October 2013

1942 births
20th-century Indian mathematicians
21st-century Indian mathematicians
Differential geometers
Harvard University alumni
City University of New York faculty
Graduate Center, CUNY faculty
Living people